Rossini is a 1942 Italian musical drama film directed by Mario Bonnard and starring Nino Besozzi, Paola Barbara, Camillo Pilotto, Armando Falconi and Greta Gonda. It depicts adult life events of Italian composer Gioachino Rossini.

It was shot at the Pisorno Studios in Tirrenia. The film's sets were designed by the art director Piero Filippone.

Plot

Cast 

Nino Besozzi as Gioachino Rossini
Paola Barbara as Isabella Colbran
Camillo Pilotto as Domenico Barbaja
Armando Falconi as Ferdinand I of the Two Sicilies
Greta Gonda as Teresa Coralli
Memo Benassi as Ludwig van Beethoven
Cesare Fantoni as Niccolò Paganini
Edoardo Toniolo as Rossini's and Paganini's Friend
Paolo Stoppa as Andrea Leone Tottola
Gildo Bocci as Duke Sforza-Cesarini
Lamberto Picasso as Col. Negri 
 Giacomo Moschini as Duke Carafa
 Gilda Marchiò as Anna Guidarini, Rossini's Mother
 Massimo Pianforini as Professor Carpassi
 Romolo Costa as Austrian Prince
 Vera Ruberti  as Viennese Noblewoman
 Franco Rondinella as Don Raffaele 
 Oreste Fares as Giovanni Paisiello 
Diana Dei as The Woman under the Rain
Oreste Bilancia as Her Husband
 Anna Maria Dionisi as Colbran's Maid

References

Bibliography
 Nicholas Mathew & Benjamin Walton. The Invention of Beethoven and Rossini: Historiography, Analysis, Criticism. Cambridge University Press, 7 Nov 2013.

External links
 

1940s musical drama films
Italian musical drama films
Films directed by Mario Bonnard
Films about classical music and musicians
Films about composers
Italian biographical drama films
Gioachino Rossini
1940s biographical films
Italian black-and-white films
1940s historical musical films
Italian historical musical films
Cultural depictions of Italian men
1940s Italian films